Mehmet Dursun (born 16 July 1928) is a Turkish former sports shooter. He competed at the 1968, 1972 and 1976 Summer Olympics.

References

External links
 

1928 births
Possibly living people
Turkish male sport shooters
Olympic shooters of Turkey
Shooters at the 1968 Summer Olympics
Shooters at the 1972 Summer Olympics
Shooters at the 1976 Summer Olympics
Sportspeople from Diyarbakır
20th-century Turkish people